Tserendorjiin Dagvadorj (born 25 October 1940) is a Mongolian archer. He competed at the 1976 Summer Olympics and the 1980 Summer Olympics.

References

External links
 

1940 births
Living people
Mongolian male archers
Olympic archers of Mongolia
Archers at the 1976 Summer Olympics
Archers at the 1980 Summer Olympics
Place of birth missing (living people)
20th-century Mongolian people